Ungu Violet is Indonesian drama film in 2005 directed by Rako Prijanto. This SinemArt Pictures productions film stars Dian Sastrowardoyo, Rizky Hanggono, and Rima Melati. Ungu Violet premiered in Indonesian cinemas on June 23, 2005.

Plot
Lando (Rizky Hanggono) was a photographer whose fiancée had just left him. In his distress, he met a busway ticket counter girl called Kalin (Dian Sastrowardoyo). Lando's passion for life was revived, but it didn't last long. Without apparent reason, Lando left Kalin, who became very angry and heart-broken.

As time passed, Lando, still in distress, found that Kalin had become a supermodel, and saw her presence everywhere.

Lando yearned to see Kalin again and explain why he had left her. He finally got the opportunity and met Kalin, but this encounter again ended tragically as Kalin ran into an accident and turned blind. Later on, Kalin obtained a cornea donor that enabled her to see again, but she could not seem to find Lando, whom she was actually very much in love with.

Cast

External links 
 
 Official website SinemArt

2005 films
2000s Indonesian-language films
2005 romantic drama films
Films shot in Indonesia
Indonesian romantic drama films
Films directed by Rako Prijanto